Saluk (also Romanized as Sālūk) is a village in Kuh Sardeh Rural District, in the Central District of Malayer County, Hamadan Province, Iran. At the 2006 census, its population was 117, in 26 families. 'Saluk' is also used as a surname, mainly in the Aegean region of Turkey. Denizli is the most populated city by the Saluks. There are some Saluks overseas, such as Australia and India. 'Saluk' is a Turko-Persian name.

Name 
'Saluk' is believed to be derived from the name 'Saltuk' which was the name of the first ruler of an Anatolian Beylik 'Saltukids', Ebulkasım Saltuk Bey. Ebulkasım Saltuk Bey was a Seljuk commander. He formed the 'Saltukids' in Northeastern Anatolia in 1072 after a decisive victory at the Battle of Manzikert against the Byzantine Empire, in 1071. He was under the command of Alp Arslan, the second Sultan of the Seljuk Empire.

References 

Populated places in Malayer County